Savignia kartalensis is a species of sheet weaver found in the Comoros Islands. It was described by Jocqué in 1985.

References

Linyphiidae
Spiders described in 1985
Spiders of Africa